André Poppe (born 4 November 1943) is a Belgian racing cyclist. He rode in the 1970 Tour de France.

References

External links
 

1943 births
Living people
Belgian male cyclists
Place of birth missing (living people)